Zhang Xiaolong, also known as Allen Zhang, is a Chinese computer programmer and technology executive. He is known for leading the developments of WeChat and Foxmail. He is a senior executive vice president and president of Weixin Group at  Tencent Holdings Limited. Zhang received B.S. and M.S degrees in telecommunication engineering from Huazhong University of Science and Technology in 1991 and 1994, respectively.

References

1969 births
Living people
21st-century Chinese businesspeople
Chinese business executives
Chinese computer businesspeople
Chinese computer programmers
Tencent people
Huazhong University of Science and Technology alumni